Samuel R. Sommers is an American social psychologist and professor of psychology at Tufts University. He is known for his research on implicit racial stereotyping and color-blind racism. For example, he has published multiple studies on the effects of increased racial diversity in mock juries. With Michael Norton, he also published a study in 2011 showing that, on average, white people think more racism against them exists than exists against black people.  L. Jon Wertheim and Sommers wrote the book "This Is Your Brain on Sports: The Science of Underdogs, the Value of Rivalry, and What We Can Learn from the T-Shirt Cannon" to explore how psychological and neuroscience principles explain many phenomena in sports (Sports Psychology).

Honors and awards
Sommers has been a fellow of the Society for the Psychological Study of Social Issues since 2011. In 2009, he received the Gerald R. Gill Professor of the Year Award from Tufts. In 2008, he received the Saleem Shah Award for Early Career Excellence from the American Psychology-Law Society.

References

External links

Faculty page

Profile at Social Psychology Network

Living people
American social psychologists
Tufts University faculty
Williams College alumni
University of Michigan alumni
Year of birth missing (living people)